Eurolistriodon was an extinct genus of even-toed ungulates that existed during the Miocene in Europe.

References

Prehistoric Suidae
Miocene mammals of Asia
Miocene even-toed ungulates
Miocene mammals of Europe
Prehistoric even-toed ungulate genera